The island of Hokkaidō is located in the north of Japan, near Russia (Sakhalin Oblast). It has coastlines on the Sea of Japan (to the west of the island), the Sea of Okhotsk (to the north), and the Pacific Ocean (to the east). The center of the island is mountainous, with volcanic plateaux. Hokkaidō has multiple plains such as the Ishikari Plain , Tokachi Plain , the Kushiro Plain  (the largest wetland in Japan) and Sarobetsu Plain .

The Tsugaru Strait separates Hokkaidō from Honshu (Aomori Prefecture); La Pérouse Strait separates Hokkaidō from the island of Sakhalin in Russia; Nemuro Strait separates Hokkaidō from Kunashir Island in the Russian Kuril Islands.

The governmental jurisdiction of Hokkaidō incorporates several smaller islands, including Rishiri, Okushiri Island, and Rebun. (By Japanese reckoning, Hokkaidō also incorporates several of the Kuril Islands.) Hokkaidō Prefecture is the largest and northernmost Japanese prefecture. The island ranks 21st in the world by area.

Ecology

Flora and fauna 

There are three populations of the Ussuri brown bear found on the island. There are more brown bears in Hokkaidō than anywhere else in Asia besides Russia. The Hokkaidō brown bear is separated into three distinct lineages. There are only eight lineages in the world. Those on Honshu died out long ago.

The native conifer species in northern Hokkaidō is the Sakhalin fir (Abies sachalinensis). The flowering plant Hydrangea hirta is also found on the island.

{| class="wikitable sortable"
|+ Notable flora and fauna
|-
! Name !! Type 
! Notes
|-
| Ussuri brown bear
| Fauna 
| One of the largest populations by average size of brown bears (Ursus arctos lasiotus)
|-
| Steller's sea eagle
| Fauna
| On average, the heaviest eagle species in the world (Haliaeetus pelagicus)
|-
| Hokkaido wolf || Fauna 
| Extinct subspecies of the gray wolf (Canis lupus hattai).
|-
| Yezo sika deer || Fauna 
| Large subspecies of the sika deer (Cervus nippon yesoensis)
|-
| Ezoris
| Fauna
| Also called the Ezo squirrel (Sciurus vulgaris orientis)
|-
| Ezo red fox
| Fauna
| Native to northern Japanese archipelago (Vulpes vulpes schrencki)
|-
| Ezo tanuki
| Fauna
| Subspecies of raccoon dog native to Hokkaido (Nyctereutes viverrinus albus)
|-
| Hokkaido dog
| Fauna
| A Spitz-type domesticated hunting dog perhaps descend from introduced Akitas
|-
| Dosanko
| Fauna
| Also called the "Hokkaido horse" 
|-
|Sable
|Fauna
|(Martes zibellina) A species of marten which inhabits Hokkaido and Northern Asia.
|-
| Viviparous lizard
| Fauna
| (Zootoca vivipara)
|-
| Ezo salamander
| Fauna
| (Hynobius retardatus)
|-
| Dolly Varden trout
| Fauna
| (Salvelinus malma)
|-
|Sasakia charonda
|Fauna
|National butterfly of Japan (ō-murasaki, "great purple")
|-
|Grey Heron
|Fauna
|(Ardea cinerea) Long legged wading bird.
|-
|Chum salmon
|Fauna
|(white salmon (白鮭 シロサケ) is native to middle and northern Honshu, Hokkaido and the North Pacific.
|-
|Sockeye salmon
|Fauna
|(Oncorhynchus nerka, ベニザケ - Benizake) live in Hokkaido and the North Pacific.
|-
| Ezo spruce
| Flora
| Picea jezoensis
|-
| Sakhalin spruce
| Flora
| Picea glehnii
|-
| Japanese rose
| Flora
| Rosa rugosa
|}

Geology 

Like many areas of Japan, Hokkaidō is seismically active. Aside from numerous earthquakes, the following volcanoes are considered still active (at least one eruption since 1850):

 Hokkaido Koma-ga-take
 Mount Usu and Shōwa-shinzan
 Mount Tarumae
 Mount Tokachi
 Mount Meakan

In 1993, an earthquake of magnitude 7.7 generated a tsunami which devastated Okushiri, killing 202 inhabitants. An earthquake of magnitude 8.3 struck near the island on September 26, 2003. On September 6, 2018, an earthquake of magnitude 6.6 struck with its epicenter near the city of Tomakomai, causing a blackout across the whole island.

On May 16, 2021, an earthquake measuring 6.1 on the Richter scale struck off Japan's Hokkaidō prefecture.

Parks 

 Twelve prefectural natural parks (道立自然公園). The prefectural natural parks cover 146,802 ha, the largest area of any prefecture.
Akkeshi Prefectural Natural Park
Esan Prefectural Natural Park
Furano-Ashibetsu Prefectural Natural Park
Hiyama Prefectural Natural Park
Kariba-Motta Prefectural Natural Park
Matsumae-Yagoshi Prefectural Natural Park
North Okhotsk Prefectural Natural Park
Nopporo Shinrin Kōen Prefectural Natural Park
Notsuke-Fūren Prefectural Natural Park
Sharidake Prefectural Natural Park
Shumarinai Prefectural Natural Park
Teshiodake Prefectural Natural Park

Subprefectures 

, Hokkaidō has nine General Subprefectural Bureaus (総合振興局) and five Subprefectural Bureaus (振興局). Hokkaidō is one of eight prefectures in Japan that have subprefectures (支庁 shichō). However, it is the only one of the eight to have such offices covering the whole of its territory outside the main cities (rather than having them just for outlying islands or remote areas). This is mostly because of its great size; many parts of the prefecture are simply too far away to be effectively administered by Sapporo. Subprefectural offices in Hokkaidō carry out many of the duties that prefectural offices fulfill elsewhere in Japan.

Climate

As Japan's coldest region, Hokkaidō has relatively cool summers and icy/snowy winters. Most of the island falls in the humid continental climate zone with Köppen climate classification Dfb (hemiboreal) in most areas but Dfa (hot summer humid continental) in some inland lowlands.

The northern portion of Hokkaidō falls into the taiga biome with significant snowfall. The island tends to have isolated snowstorms that develop long-lasting snowbanks. The generally high quality of powder snow and numerous mountains in Hokkaidō make it a popular region for snow sports. The snowfall usually commences in earnest in November and ski resorts (such as those at Niseko, Furano, Teine and Rusutsu) usually operate between December and April. Hokkaidō celebrates its winter weather at the Sapporo Snow Festival.

During the winter, passage through the Sea of Okhotsk is often complicated by large floes of drift ice. Combined with high winds that occur during winter, this frequently brings air travel and maritime activity to a halt beyond the northern coast of Hokkaidō. Ports on the open Pacific Ocean and Sea of Japan are generally ice-free year round, though most rivers freeze during the winter.

Unlike the other major islands of Japan, Hokkaidō is normally not affected by the May–June monsoon season and the lack of relative humidity and typically warm, rather than hot, summer weather makes its climate an attraction for tourists from other parts of Japan.

Climate data

Gallery

See also
 Geography of Japan
 Kuril Islands
 Sakhalin
 Japan Trench

References

Hokkaido